Merit Energy Company is one of the largest privately held US-based oil and gas companies by production volume, with some $1 billion in net income on $2.1 billion in revenue. The company was formed in 1989 by William K. Gayden, formerly of EDS and Petrus Oil and Gas L.P., which was founded by H. Ross Perot.

Operations are divided among two divisions: North and South.

Merit specializes in purchasing high quality, producing oil and gas assets and making them more efficient. The company owns and operates over 11,000 wells in the United States. Over $5.9 billion in assets have been purchased since 1989.

References

External links
 

Oil companies of the United States
Natural gas companies of the United States
Companies based in Dallas
Non-renewable resource companies established in 1989
1989 establishments in Texas
Privately held companies based in Texas